Thomas Frank Oakes (1874 – after 1900) was an English professional footballer who made 35 appearances in the Football League playing for Small Heath. He played as a forward.

Oakes was born in Cheltenham, Gloucestershire. He played football for Hereford Thistle before joining Small Heath of the Football League Second Division in 1896, making his debut in a 3–1 victory at Blackpool on 23 January 1897. He played regularly for the remainder of the 1896–97 season and the next, but appeared only rarely for the first team over the next two seasons, and left for non-league football with Gloucester City.

References

1874 births
Year of death missing
Sportspeople from Cheltenham
English footballers
Association football forwards
Hereford Thistle F.C. players
Birmingham City F.C. players
Gloucester City A.F.C. players
English Football League players
Date of birth missing
Place of death missing